Margarete Slezak (9 January 1901 – 30 August 1953) was an Austro-German singer and actress. She was the sister of the actor Walter Slezak.

Selected filmography
 Derby (1949)
 King for One Night (1950)
 Abundance of Life (1950)
 The Csardas Princess (1951)
 Maya of the Seven Veils (1951)
 One Night's Intoxication (1951)
 Shame on You, Brigitte! (1952)
 The Flower of Hawaii (1953)
 Under the Stars of Capri (1953)
 Not Afraid of Big Animals (1953)

References

Bibliography 
 Richard Newman & Karen Kirtley. Alma Rosé: Vienna to Auschwitz. Amadeus Press, 2000.

External links

1901 births
1953 deaths
20th-century Austrian women singers
Austrian film actresses
Actors from Bratislava
20th-century Austrian actresses
Musicians from Bratislava